Charlesite is a sulfate mineral of the ettringite group. Charlesite was named in 1945 after Dr. Charles Palache  mineralogist and professor at Harvard University for his work on minerals. This mineral is extremely rare, and when it is found it is often in crystal (but not gem) form. Its crystals are soft hexagonal, that can vary in color. Colors can range from clear to white, or even a pale yellow or pink. The brittle mineral's Mohs hardness is 2.5 with a specific gravity of 1.79. Though transparent to the eye the mineral has a white streak.

Occurrence 

Charlesite has only been found in a few specific locations in the world. The first was its place of discovery in Franklin Mine in Franklin, Sussex County, New Jersey. It was located immediately above the 800 level, about 15 feet into the ore from the hanging wall. The ore mostly consisted of franklinite and willemite and several other minor minerals. The crystals found at this location were up to 6mm in length and were suspected to have grown alongside clinohedrite crystals.

The other location where charlesite has been located is the Wessel's Mine, N' Chwaning Mines, and Kalahari Manganese Fields in Northern Cape Province, South Africa. The Wessel's Mine is thought to be the only source for charlesite to be found in gem quality.

Several of the other recorded places are Germany, Japan, Norway, Romania, and Slovakia.

Uses

Due to its rarity, there are not very many uses for charlesite. Though there is not much of the mineral, one of the major uses for the ones that reach the standards is gems. Due to its softness it will not be found in much jewelry.

Some other uses could be for studying (the reasons for the rarity of the mineral), teaching mineralogy classes, or even items for collectors or museums of rare minerals.

Composition

References

Dunn P.J., Peacor D.R., Leavens P.B., Baum J.L.,1983, American Mineralogist, Charlesite, a new mineral of the ettringite group, New Jersey 

Sulfate minerals
Trigonal minerals
Minerals in space group 159
Borate sulfates